The 2019 General Tire 200 was the fourth stock car race of the 2019 ARCA Menards Series season and the 57th iteration of the event. The race was held on Friday, April 26, 2019, in Lincoln, Alabama at Talladega Superspeedway, a 2.66 miles (4.28 km) permanent triangle-shaped superspeedway. The race took the scheduled 76 laps to complete. At race's end, Todd Gilliland of DGR-Crosley would dominate the late stages of the race to win his second and to date, final career ARCA Menards Series race and his first and only win of the season. To fill out the podium, Ty Majeski of Chad Bryant Racing and Andy Seuss of Our Motorsports would finish second and third, respectively.

Background 

Talladega Superspeedway, originally known as Alabama International Motor Superspeedway (AIMS), is a motorsports complex located north of Talladega, Alabama. It is located on the former Anniston Air Force Base in the small city of Lincoln. The track is a tri-oval and was constructed in the 1960s by the International Speedway Corporation, a business controlled by the France family. Talladega is most known for its steep banking and the unique location of the start/finish line that's located just past the exit to pit road. The track currently hosts the NASCAR series such as the NASCAR Cup Series, Xfinity Series and the Gander RV & Outdoors Truck Series. Talladega is the longest NASCAR oval with a length of 2.66-mile-long (4.28 km) tri-oval like the Daytona International Speedway, which also is a 2.5-mile-long (4 km) tri-oval.

Entry list

Practice 
The only 30-minute practice session was held on Friday, April 26, at 9:30 AM EST.

Qualifying 
Qualifying was held on Friday, April 26, at 3:30 PM EST. Each driver would have two laps to set a fastest time; the fastest of the two would count as their official qualifying lap.

Full qualifying results

Race results

References 

2019 ARCA Menards Series
NASCAR races at Talladega Superspeedway
April 2019 sports events in the United States
2019 in sports in Alabama